Paul Laus (born September 26, 1970) is a Canadian former professional ice hockey defenceman who played in the National Hockey League for the Florida Panthers. Laus was the last original members of the Panthers.

Career
Born in Beamsville, Ontario, Laus was a Junior B standout with the St. Catharines Falcons before joining the Ontario Hockey League. He spent three years with the Hamilton Steelhawks/Niagara Falls Thunder franchise and was selected 37th overall by the Pittsburgh Penguins at the 1989 NHL Entry Draft. He spent his first three years as a pro in the International Hockey League and ECHL, including a stint with the short-lived Albany Choppers.

The rugged blueliner was claimed by the Florida Panthers in the 1993 NHL Expansion Draft. His solid defensive work and willingness to take on the toughest players in the league made him a valuable player on the club as it set an NHL record for expansion teams with 83 points. Two years later, he scored two goals and was a workhorse in 21 games as the Panthers reached the Stanley Cup finals. Laus continued to be an enforcer and team leader through the end of the 2000–01 season and was the only person to play in all of the club's first eight seasons. His grit and determination made him a fan favourite and he is still one of the most beloved all-time Panthers along with Scott Mellanby.

In the 1996–97 NHL season Laus set an NHL record with 39 fighting majors in 77 games while also setting career highs in assists, points, plus/minus, and penalty minutes.

However, injuries limited Laus to only 70 games over his last two seasons. After his latest wrist injury, in 2002, he never played another professional game. Eventually, Laus officially retired and moved back to Ontario.

Records
Holds the NHL record for most fighting majors in a season with 39, set during the 1996–97 season.
Florida Panthers team record: Most career penalty minutes (1,702)

Career statistics

External links
The Internet Hockey Database - Paul Laus
Interview with Paul Laus

1970 births
Living people
Albany Choppers players
Canadian ice hockey defencemen
Cleveland Lumberjacks players
Florida Panthers players
Hamilton Steelhawks players
Ice hockey people from Ontario
Knoxville Cherokees players
Muskegon Lumberjacks players
Niagara Falls Thunder players
Pittsburgh Penguins draft picks
St. Catharines Falcons (OHA) players